GlobalNxt University (formerly Universitas 21 Global or U21Global) is an accredited university with academic headquarters in Kuala Lumpur, Malaysia. The university specialises primarily in management studies.

History

U21Global was formed in June 2001 in Singapore as a joint venture between Universitas 21 and Thomson Learning (which later became Cengage Learning). Universitas 21 consists of a network of universities including University of Melbourne, University of Nottingham, University of Virginia and the National University of Singapore.

In late 2007, Cengage Learning sold its entire 50% in U21Global share to Mauritius-based Manipal Universal Learning International for an undisclosed sum. In 2010, the Universitas 21 shareholding was diluted to 25 per cent, with only 10 universities continuing to hold equity.

In 2012, U21Global was invited by the Malaysia Ministry of Higher Education to re-establish itself in Malaysia as part of the country's strategic drive to become a global educational hub. U21Global was re-established as GlobalNxt University, an accredited university in Malaysia with offices now based in Kuala Lumpur, Malaysia.

Programmes
GlobalNxt University offers courses in Master of Business Administration (MBA), Postgraduate Diploma of Business Administration, Master of Science in Information Technology Management, Doctor of Business Administration (DBA) and PhD Education. In Malaysia, all degree programmes must pass a rigorous external review before being granted full accreditation by the Malaysian Qualifications Agency.

In addition, the university operates executive programmes in conjunction with industry partners.
 Women's Leadership Programme (WLP)
 Certificate in Global Business Leadership (CGBL)
 Building Business Partnerships (BBP)
 Sales Excellence Programme (SEP)

See also
Thomson Learning
Cengage Learning

References

External links

Malaysian educational websites
Sikkim Manipal University
Universities and colleges in Kuala Lumpur
Educational institutions established in 2001
2001 establishments in Malaysia
Private universities and colleges in Malaysia